Noah Great Voyage in Yokohama 2023 was a professional wrestling event promoted by CyberFight's sub-brand Pro Wrestling Noah. It took place on March 19, 2023, in Yokohama, Japan, at the Yokohama Budokan. The event aired CyberAgent's AbemaTV online linear television service and CyberFight's streaming service Wrestle Universe.

Storylines
The event will feature professional wrestling matches that involve different wrestlers from pre-existing scripted feuds and storylines. Wrestlers portray villains, heroes, or less distinguishable characters in scripted events that build tension and culminate in a wrestling match or series of matches.

Event
Following the events from Great Voyage in Osaka from February 12, 2023, it was revealed that Jake Lee was set to be the next number one contender for Kiyomiya's Heavyweight Championship.

The event started with two preshow matches broadcast on Noah's YouTube channel. In the first one, Yasutaka Yano picked up a victory over Daishi Ozawa in singles competition. In the next one, Atsushi Kotoge, Yo-Hey, Seiki Yoshioka and Alejandro overcame the team of Shuji Kondo, Tadasuke, Hajime Ohara and Hi69. In the first main card match, Katsuhiko Nakajima defeated Kinya Okada in singles competition. Next up, Hideki Suzuki and Saxon Huxley outmatched Mohammed Yone and Yoshiki Inamura. In the fifth bout, Shuhei Taniguchi defeated Takashi Sugiura. In the sixth bout, Good Looking Guys (Jack Morris and Anthony Greene) defeated Naomichi Marufuji and El Hijo de Dr. Wagner Jr.. Next, Extreme Tiger and Lanzeloth defeated GHC Junior Heavyweight Champion Amakusa and Ninja Mack in tag team action. In the eighth bout, Masa Kitamiya and Daiki Inaba defended the GHC Tag Team Championship for the first time against Kongo (Kenoh and Manabu Soya). After the match concluded, All Japan Pro Wrestling's Kento Miyahara stepped up to challenge Kitamiya for "Dream Power Series" on March 21, 2023. In the semi main event, Yoshinari Ogawa and Eita retained the GHC Junior Heavyweight Tag Team Championship for the second time consecutivelly in that respective reign against Hayata and Chris Ridgeway. After the bout concluded, Ogawa slapped Eita and shook hands with Hayata and Ridgeway, reminding him that he was still part of Stinger as he left Eita behind in the ring.

In the main event, Jake Lee defeated Kaito Kiyomiya to win the GHC Heavyweight Championship. Tadasuke was also shown wearing a "Good Looking Guys" shirt befre the match, hinting his defection from Kongo. After the bout concluded, Katsuhiko Nakajima issued a challenge for Lee's title.

Results

References

External links
 Pro Wrestling Noah official website

Pro Wrestling Noah
CyberAgent
2023 in professional wrestling
March 2023 events in Japan
Professional wrestling in Yokohama
Pro Wrestling Noah shows